Abrosimovo is a rural locality (a village) in Bryzgalovskoye Rural Settlement, Kameshkovsky District, Vladimir Oblast, Russia. The population was 23 as of 2010.

Geography 
Abrosimovo is located 13 km northeast of Kameshkovo (the district's administrative centre) by road. Shukhurdino is the nearest rural locality.

References 

Rural localities in Kameshkovsky District